A by-election was held for the New South Wales Legislative Assembly electorate of Orange on 4 March 1879. It was triggered because the Elections and Qualifications Committee held that Edward Combes position of Executive Commissioner for New South Wales at the Paris International Exhibition was an office of profit under the crown and his seat was declared vacant.

Dates

Results

The seat of Edward Combes was declared vacant for holding an office of profit under the crown.

See also
Electoral results for the district of Orange
List of New South Wales state by-elections

References

1879 elections in Australia
New South Wales state by-elections
1870s in New South Wales